Padwick Green (8 April 1898 – 17 May 1941) was a Guyanese cricketer. He played in one first-class match for British Guiana in 1921/22.

See also
 List of Guyanese representative cricketers

References

External links
 

1898 births
1941 deaths
Guyanese cricketers
Guyana cricketers
Sportspeople from Georgetown, Guyana